Bilaspur State or Kahlur State, sometimes Kahloor Riyasat, was a kingdom (697-1849) and later princely state (1849-1948) in the Punjab Province ruled by a separate branch of Chandravanshi Chandel dynasty. Raja Bir Chand 697-730 was the founder of the state but it was named Kahlur only after the Construction of Kahlur Fort by Raja Kahal Chand around 890-930CE and Raja Anand Chand the 44th Raja was the last ruler.

The state was earlier known as Kahlur Riyasat and was later renamed Bilaspur. The last ruler of Bilaspur State acceded to the Indian Union on 12 October 1948.

Bilaspur State remained Bilaspur Province in independent India until 1950 when the province was briefly renamed "Bilaspur State" before it was merged with Himachal Pradesh state as a district in 1954.

In the pre-partitioned Punjab, the Raja of Kahlur (Bilaspur) elevated the Kolis to the status of Kshatriya and he wanted them to serve in his army and Raja did so.

History
According to local oral tradition and records during the reign of Raja Harihar Chand, a new state was founded around 697 CE by his son First Ruler Raja Bir Chand. After Raja Kahal Chand had built Kahlur Fort the state was named Kahlur (probably from Kahal-pur) and the ruling Chandel Dynasty of Kahlur was also Known as Kahluria.
Initially the capital of the state was at a place named Jandbari — now in Hoshiarpur district — and then it was transferred to Kahlur Fort, but was later moved permanently to present town Bilaspur by Dip Chand, the 32nd Raja of Kahlur
 
Raja Bhim Chand who succeeded Raja Deep Chand fought Battle of Nadaun against Mughals and came out victorious. Mughals under Alif Khan were supported by Raja of Kangra and Raja Dayal of Bijarwal
When Raja Bhim Chand abdicated in 1692 to lead a life of sanyasi the state was at previously unknown heights.
The reign of Bhim Chand's son Ajmer Chand was of conquest as well. By the end of his forty years reign the number of states paying tribute was considerable: Baghal State, Baghat, Keonthal, Beja, Mangal, Bhajji, Mahlog, Dhami, Kuthar, Kotkhai, Kunihar, Balsan, and Nehra among others. All continued to pay tribute until Mahan Chand reign 1778 but by 1790 only Mangal State continued to acknowledge Bilaspur'so suzerainty.
Since the 18th-century the rulers of Bilaspur State patronised artists of the Kangra painting style.

Bilaspur State came under British protection in 1815 under Raja Mahan Chand and became one of the Simla Hill States. Raja Anand Chand was the last ruler of the princely state and Pandit Sant Ram was the last Home Minister. As Bilaspur acceded to India on 28 October 1948, Bilaspur retained an independent identity as a separate province and as a part-C State of India. The Raja was appointed commissioner of the State. In following years after Raja resigned his deputy Chhabra, who was appointed by govt of India, helped run the temporary govt of Bilaspur while the territory of the princely state was politically integrated into the Indian Union.

From 26 January 1950 Bilaspur was administered by the Government of India as a separate C-Class state named Bilaspur State which in 1954 was incorporated into the State of Himachal Pradesh as a province.

The Family
Chandel in Bilaspur belong to different branches of the ruling family. These families are numerous, and all enjoyed jagir pensions from state amounting in aggregate to Rs. 40,000 a year in 1933. The chief names are:
Ajmerchandia
Kaliyanchandia
Tarachandia
Sultanchandia

Rajas

Bir Chand, founder;
Udhran Chand
Jaskarn Chand
Madanbrahm Chand
Ahl Chand
Kahal Chand, 6th Raja;()
Slar Chand
Men Chand
Sen Chand
Sulkhan Chand
Kahn Chand, 11th Raja. Conquered Hindur, which he created as a separate realm for his second son.
Ajit Chand, 12th Raja (son of Khan Chand)
Gokul Chand
Udai Chand,
Gen Chand
Pruthvi Chand
Sangar Chand,
Megh Chand,
Dev Chand
Ahim Chand
Abhisand Chand,
Sampurn Chand
Rattan Chand
Narandar Chand
Fath Chand
Pahar Chand
Ram Chand
Uttam Chand
Gyan Chand
Bikram Chand
Sultan Chand
Kalyan Chand
Tara Chand
Dip Chand
Bhim Chand (Kahlur)
Ajmer Chand
Devi Chand
Mahan Chand
Kharak Chand
Jagat Chand
Hira Chand
Amar Chand
Bijai Chand
Anand Chand

References

Further reading
 Hutchinson, J. & J. PH Vogel (1933). History of the Panjab Hill States, Vol. II. 1st edition: Govt. Printing, Pujab, Lahore, 1933. Reprint 2000. Department of Language and Culture, Himachal Pradesh. Chapter XIII Bilaspur State, pp. 494–518.

States and territories established in 1815
States and territories disestablished in 1948
Bilaspur, Himachal Pradesh
Rajputs
Princely states of Himachal Pradesh
7th-century establishments in India
697 establishments
1948 disestablishments in India